Synaptotagmin-1 is a protein that in humans is encoded by the SYT1 gene.

Function 
Synaptotagmins are integral membrane proteins of synaptic vesicles thought to serve as sensors for calcium ions (Ca2+) in the process of vesicular trafficking and exocytosis. Calcium ion binding to synaptotagmin I participates in triggering neurotransmitter release at the synapse. [Supplied by OMIM]

SYT1 is the master switch responsible for allowing the human brain to release neurotransmitters. SYT1 senses calcium ion concentrations as low as 10 ppm and subsequently signals the SNARE complex to open fusion pores.

Interactions 

SYT1 has been shown to interact with SNAP-25, STX1A and S100A13.

Clinical Significance 
Mutations in the SYT1 gene cause a rare neurodevelopmental disorder known as SYT1-associated neurodevelopmental disorder (or Baker-Gordon Syndrome).

References

Further reading